Hayley McElhinney (born 12 September 1974) is an Australian stage, film and television actress.

Graduating from the Western Australian Academy of Performing Arts in 1999, McElhinney has performed around Australia and in the United States with the Melbourne Theatre Company, Black Swan Theatre Company, Perth Theatre Company and Sydney Theatre Company. She was nominated for a Helpmann Award in 2007 and was a core member of Sydney Theatre Company's Actor's Company ensemble from 2006 – 2008. She played Sonya in the Sydney Theatre Company production of Uncle Vanya which met with excellent reviews when it played in Sydney (2010), Washington, D.C. (2011) and Manhattan (2012)

She is the sister of Mandy McElhinney.

Selected filmography

References

External links

Uncle Vanya Wows New York

1974 births
Living people
21st-century Australian actresses
Australian stage actresses
Australian film actresses
Australian television actresses